Stephen Tyrone Williams (born 1982) is an American actor best known for such films and television series as The Knick, Da Sweet Blood of Jesus, Elementary and Phil Spector.

Williams is also a stage actor known for such plays as Athol Fugard's My Children! My Africa! and his Broadway debut, Lucky Guy.

Filmography

Film

Television

References

External links

African-American male actors
American male film actors
Place of birth missing (living people)
American male television actors
American male stage actors
Living people
21st-century American male actors
1982 births
21st-century African-American people
20th-century African-American people